The Jefferson County School System is the second-largest public school system in Alabama, United States. It is the third oldest school system in Jefferson County preceded only by the Birmingham and Bessemer School Systems.  The Jefferson County School System was created in 1896, and initially served all unincorporated communities and cities in the county other than Birmingham and Bessemer.   Beginning in the late 1960s and early 1970s various other cities began to establish their own separate systems (i.e., Homewood, Midfield, Vestavia Hills, Hoover, etc.). Today the County system serves students in those unincorporated areas of Jefferson County, Alabama such as Alliance, Bagley, Concord, Corner, Forestdale, McCalla, Minor, Mt. Olive, and Oak Grove.  It also includes students who reside in the cities of Adamsville, Clay, Fultondale, Gardendale, Graysville, Hueytown, Irondale, Kimberly, Morris, Pinson, Pleasant Grove, and Warrior among others.  Those cities listed below each have a city-based school system, therefore, their students do not attend schools in the Jefferson County School System:

 Bessemer (Bessemer Public Schools)   (established in 1887)
 Birmingham (Birmingham City Schools)   (established in 1874)
 Fairfield (Fairfield City Schools)  (established 1923?)
 Homewood (Homewood Public Schools) (established 1970)
 Hoover (Hoover City Schools) (established 1987)
 Leeds (Leeds City Schools) (established 2003)
 Midfield (Midfield City Schools) (established 1970)
 Mountain Brook (Mountain Brook School System) (established 1959)
 Tarrant (Tarrant City Schools) (established 1930)
 Trussville (Trussville City Schools) (established 2005)
 Vestavia Hills (Vestavia Hills School System) (established 1970)

Current Board Members, Responsibilities, and Election
The system is presided over by the elected Jefferson County Board of Education which is responsible for setting school policy, adoption of an annual operating budget, and broad issues usually dealt with by most school boards, such as construction of new schools, etc. The Board also relies on the guidance of the Superintendent in the making of many of those decisions.   the work of the Board is financed by appropriations from the Alabama Legislature and a series of property taxes some of which are "district wide" and some of which are "county wide" in nature, plus the proceeds of a 1 cent sales tax.

The Board consists of five members elected by Place Number in partisan elections for six year terms.  While these races are usually decided in the respective party primaries almost none of the work or decisions of the Board are of a partisan nature.  There is no limitation on the number of terms to which a member can be elected.  Four of the five members (Places 1-4) are elected only by the voters of the areas actually served by the school board.  The fifth member (Place 5) is elected collectively only by the voters of the 11 cities that have their own school systems.  This configuration is mandated by State law. When vacancies occur during a term the remaining members of the Board have the power to appoint someone to the post for the remainder of the unexpired term.  Two of the current members came to office in this manner when Ronnie Dixon was appointed to replace Dean Taylor, Jr. who died in office and Carita Venable replaced Jacqueline Smith who resigned. Officers of the board are elected for one-year terms from the five members.  The immediate past President of the Board is Oscar Mann.  The current President is Ronnie Dixon who was elected to the post in November, 2019.

The current Board members, their party affiliation, and the designated Place Number when they appear on the ballot are as follows:

(1) Dixon was appointed to the Board in May, 2016.
(2) Venable was appointed to the Board in February, 2019.

History
During the COVID-19 pandemic in Alabama, the school district required face masks for all of the 2020-2021 school year.

Past Board Members (Partial List)
Many different men and women have served on the Board over the years.  For most of the Board's history all its members were Democrats until the election of Republican Jim Hicks in 1980.  After Mr. Hicks election the Board transitioned to a Republican majority over the next few election cycles.  It has remained with a Republican majority ever since.  Three African-Americans have served on the Board including the present Board member, Carita Venable.  Previously, Martha Bouyer, and Jacqueline Smith served with Mrs. Smith being the first African-American to be elected as Board President. Below is a partial listing of past members:

 William A. Berry (D)
 Carl R. Bottenfield (D)
 Martha V. J. Bouyer (D) (2014-2018)
 Roy F. Bragg (D)
 Jack E. Brymer (D)
 Mary M. Buckelew (R)
 Chester Cowan, Jr. (D)
 Jack M. Dabbs (D)
 Robert L. "Bob" Ellis, Jr.(D)
 Betsy Faucette (D)
 Randall Goodwin (D) (1978-1984)
 Belva Green (R) 
 Owen G. Gresham (D)
 Robert Gwin (D)
 Mrs. Robert (Harriette) Gwin (D)
 Jim R. Hicks (R) (1980-1992)
 W. A. Jenkins, Jr. (D)
 L. E. Kirby (D)
 Joseph E. Lacey (D)
 Tommy Little
 Bill Mewbourne (D) (1984-1986)
 Karen Smith Nix (R) (retired 2012)
 Jennifer Hatcher Parsons (R) (1998-2016)
 W. I. Pittman (D)
 Ronald Rhodes (R) (2000-2013)
 George M. Rogers (D)
 George Rudd (D)
 Jacqueline A. Smith (D) (1986-2018)
 Jeffrey Dean Taylor, Jr. (R) (2014-2016)
 Kevin Walsh (R)

Superintendents
Day-to-day operations of the system are run by the superintendent. That post is filled by appointment by a majority vote of the County Board of Education and that individual serves at the pleasure of the Board. The most recent superintendent was Dr. Craig Pouncey, who took over in June 2014, following the ouster of Dr. Stephen Nowlin after 16 months in office.  On September 11, 2019, it was announced that Dr. Pouncey had accepted the Presidency of Coastal Alabama Community College, effective October 1, 2019 and would leave his post with Jefferson County on September 27.   Dr. Walter Gonsoulin, Jr., the Deputy Superintendent became Interim Superintendent on September 27, 2019 and was given the position permanently by the Board in November, 2019, becoming the first African-American to be permanent Superintendent.

The first Superintendent of Jefferson County was Isaac Wellington McAdory from 1896–1913.  In 1868, shortly after The Civil War and long before the County System existed, he and his wife, Alice (Sadler) McAdory, established and ran the Pleasant Hill Academy in McCalla.  It was arguably the first education institution in Jefferson County preceding both the Birmingham and Bessemer systems and even predating any colleges or universities in the county.  The Pleasant Hill Academy is the forerunner of present-day McAdory High School.   The first seven superintendents of the system all had schools named in their honor.  However, McNeil School no longer exists and Simmons Elementary is now part of the Hoover School System.  Issac Wellington McAdory is the only Superintendent who has three separate schools named in his honor which may be more of a coincidence than a deliberate effort.

List of current schools

High schools 
The Jefferson County School District includes the following fourteen high schools. Data on enrollment, student-teacher ratio, and graduation rate are all drawn from the 2013–14 academic year. 

(1) Oak Grove is a combined Middle and High School campus containing grades 6–12.

(2) Both Pleasant Grove and Fultondale are combined Middle and High School campus containing grades 7–12.

Middle schools
 Bagley Junior High School
 Erwin Middle School
 Minor Middle School (formerly C. R. Bottenfield Junior High School)
 Bragg Middle School
 Brighton Middle School
 Clay-Chalkville Middle School
 Hueytown Middle School (formerly W. I. Pittman Junior High School)
 Irondale Middle School
 North Jefferson Middle School
 Rudd Middle School
McAdory Middle School

Elementary schools
 Adamsville Elementary School
 Brookville Elementary School
 Bryan Elementary School
 Center Point Elementary School
 Chalkville Elementary School
 Clay Elementary School
 Concord Elementary School
 Crumly Chapel Elementary School
 Erwin Elementary School
 Fultondale Elementary School
 Gardendale Elementary School
 Greenwood Elementary School (was Greenwood Junior High School 1959-1966)
 Gresham Elementary School
 Hillview Elementary School
 Hueytown Elementary School
 Johnson Elementary School
 Lipscomb Elementary School
 McAdory Elementary School
 Mount Olive Elementary School
 North Highland Elementary School
 Oak Grove Elementary School (K-5)
 Pinson Elementary School
 Pleasant Grove Elementary School
 Snow Rogers Elementary School
 Warrior Elementary School
 West Jefferson Elementary School

Community schools
 Corner Schools
 Grantswood Community School
 Irondale Community School
 Minor Community School

Former schools (Partial List)

With the passage of years many former schools in the Jefferson County School System completely ceased to exist. This is to be expected in a system that is over 100 years old.  Most were established by the County Board of Education, yet some were first established by a local community or were built as "company schools" and ceded to the County System at a later date.  Other schools have seen their names changed or been sold or ceded to some of the other municipal systems.  This occurs for a variety of reasons some of which are demographic changes, de-segregation orders, obsolete facilities, etc.  Many of these campuses are gone without a trace and a few have been re-purposed to other uses.  This list does not include former school buildings at different sites for institutions that still exist under the same name such as Shades Valley High School (2 different campuses); Hueytown High School (3 different campuses); Minor High School (2 campuses), etc.  The list does include schools whose names and/or locations have changed such as Berry High School (now Hoover High School) or New Castle High School (now Fultondale High School).

High Schools (Partial List)

Other Schools (Partial List)

Failing schools
Statewide testing ranks the schools in Alabama. Those in the bottom six percent are listed as "failing." As of early 2018, both Center Point and Minor High Schools were included in this category.

References

External links

 Jefferson County Board of Education website

School districts in Alabama
Education in Jefferson County, Alabama
Year of establishment missing
1896 establishments in Alabama
School districts established in 1896